The year 1908 in science and technology involved some significant events, listed below.

Archaeology
 A 40,000-year-old Neanderthal boy skeleton is found at Le Moustier in southwest France by Otto Hauser.

Astronomy
 If its start and end are defined using mean solar time then due to the extreme length of day variation this is the longest year of the Julian calendar or Gregorian calendar, having a duration of 31622401.38 seconds of Terrestrial Time (or ephemeris time).

Chemistry
 Kikunae Ikeda discovers monosodium glutamate, the chemical behind the taste of umami.
 Heike Kamerlingh Onnes liquefies helium.

Genetics
 G. H. Hardy and Wilhelm Weinberg independently formulate the Hardy–Weinberg principle which states that both allele and genotype frequencies in a population remain in equilibrium unless disturbed. proposes that genetic defects cause many inherited diseases.

History of science
 Site of Ulugh Beg Observatory located in Samarkand by Russian archaeologist V. L. Vyatkin.
 National Technical Museum (Prague) founded.

Mathematics
 Ernst Zermelo axiomizes set theory, thus avoiding Cantor's contradictions.
 Josip Plemelj solves the Riemann problem about the existence of a differential equation with a given monodromic group and uses Sokhotsky-Plemelj formulae.
 Student's t-distribution published by William Sealy Gosset (anonymously).

Paleontology
 Edmontosaurus mummy AMNH 5060, an exceptionally well-preserved fossil dinosaur, is discovered near Lusk, Wyoming.

Physics
 Hans Geiger and Ernest Rutherford invent the Geiger counter.
 Gustav Mie publishes the Mie solution to Maxwell's equations on the scattering of electromagnetic radiation by a sphere.

Physiology and medicine
 April 27 – First Congress for Freudian Psychology, held in Salzburg.
 Swiss psychiatrist Eugen Bleuler introduces the term schizophrenia.
 Austrian American pathologist Leo Buerger gives the first accurate pathological description of Thromboangiitis obliterans ("Buerger's disease") at Mount Sinai Hospital (Manhattan).
 Victor Horsley and R. Clarke invents the stereotactic method.
 Margaret Reed Lewis, working in Berlin, becomes probably the first person successfully to grow mammalian tissue in vitro.

Technology
 January 12 – A long-distance radio message is sent from the Eiffel Tower for the first time.
 Henry Ford develops the assembly line method of automobile manufacturing and produces the first Model T automobile.

Awards
 Nobel Prizes
 Physics – Gabriel Lippmann
 Chemistry – Ernest Rutherford
 Nobel Prize in Physiology or Medicine – Ilya Ilyich Mechnikov and Paul Ehrlich

Births
 January 15 – Edward Teller (died 2003), Hungarian-born physicist, inventor of the hydrogen bomb.
 January 18 – Jacob Bronowski (died 1974), Polish-born scientific polymath.
 January 22 – Lev Davidovich Landau (died 1968), Russian physicist.
 February 11 – Vivian Fuchs (died 1999), English geologist and explorer.
 February 25 – Mary Locke Petermann (died 1975), American cellular biochemist.
 March 15 – Thure von Uexküll (died 2004), German pioneer of psychosomatic medicine.
 May 14 – Nicholas Kurti, born Kürti Miklós (died 1998), Hungarian-born physicist.
 May 23 – John Bardeen (died 1991), American physicist, co-inventor of the transistor, only physicist to receive the Nobel Prize in Physics twice.
 September 2 – Nikolai Aleksandrovich Kozyrev (died 1983), Russian astronomer and astrophysicist.
 September 6 – Louis Essen (died 1997), English physicist, co-developer of the first practical atomic clock.
 September 18 – Victor Ambartsumian (died 1996), Soviet Armenian theoretical astrophysicist.
 October 10 – Min Chueh Chang (died 1991), Chinese-born embryologist.
 October 21 – Elsie Widdowson (died 2000), English nutritionist.
 November 4 – Józef Rotblat (died 2005), Polish-born physicist.
 December 24 – Noël Poynter (died 1979), English medical historian.

Deaths
 January 3 – Charles Augustus Young (born 1834), American astronomer.
 August 25 – Henri Becquerel (born 1852), French physicist.
 November 20 – Georgy Voronoy (born 1868), Russian mathematician.

References

 
20th century in science
1900s in science